Saltair or Saltaire or salt air or variant, may refer to:

Places
 Saltair, British Columbia, Canada
 Saltair, Ohio, United States
 Saltaire, a village and UNESCO world heritage site in West Yorkshire, England, UK
 Saltaire railway station
 Saltaire, New York, a village in Suffolk County, United States
 Saltair (Utah), former names of resorts near the Great Salt Lake in Utah, United States

Other uses
Saltaire Festival, Saltaire, England, UK
Salt air
Salt Air, airline

See also

Salt (disambiguation)
Air (disambiguation)
Aire (disambiguation)

Solitaire (disambiguation)
Saltire